Ryan Anthony Brown (born 15 March 1985) is an English former footballer who played as a left-back.

Starting his professional career with Port Vale in 2003, he played 44 first team games before being released not long after his 20th birthday. He spent a season with Leek Town before he switched to Northwich Victoria. He spent four years with Victoria, before switching to Altrincham in 2010. He switched to Stafford Rangers in January 2012 before making his return to Leek Town in November 2013. He signed with Kidsgrove Athletic in October 2014.

Career
Signed up to the Port Vale youth team since age nine, he made his senior debut for the club against Bristol City on 3 May 2003, and turned professional at Vale Park under Brian Horton three months later. After a further 41 appearances in league and cup games he was released by manager Martin Foyle in May 2005 after slipping below Craig James in the first team pecking order. Following a season in the Northern Premier League Premier Division with Leek Town, he was signed by Conference National newcomers Northwich Victoria in June 2006. In April 2008 he signed a two-year extension to his contract. However he was soon transfer listed and told he had no future at the club, though in October 2008 the club's leadership changed their mind on this matter. At the end of the season Victoria were relegated back into the Conference North.

With Northwich facing expulsion to the Northern Premier League, in February 2010 Brown joined Conference club Altrincham on loan, and the switch was made permanent in the summer. He suffered relegation with the club at the end of the 2010–11 season, which left both he and the club in the Conference North for the 2011–12 campaign. Outside of football, he worked as an engineer in his native Stoke. In January 2012, he left Altrincham to sign for Stafford Rangers of the Northern Premier League Premier Division. Rangers finished 16th in 2011–12 and 15th in 2012–13. He re-signed with Leek Town, now in the Northern Premier League Division One South, in November 2013. He helped the "Blues" to a third-place finish in 2013–14, securing a place in the play-offs, where they were knocked out by Belper Town at Harrison Park. He joined league rivals Kidsgrove Athletic in October 2014. The "Grove" finished 20th in the Northern Premier League Division One South in the 2014–15 campaign, 15th in the 2015–16 season, 12th in the 2016–17 season and 18th in the 2017–18 season.

Career statistics
Source:

References

1985 births
Living people
Footballers from Stoke-on-Trent
English engineers
English footballers
Association football fullbacks
Port Vale F.C. players
Leek Town F.C. players
Northwich Victoria F.C. players
Altrincham F.C. players
Stafford Rangers F.C. players
Kidsgrove Athletic F.C. players
English Football League players
National League (English football) players
Northern Premier League players